is a railway station in the town of Wakuya, Miyagi Prefecture, Japan, operated by East Japan Railway Company (JR East).

Lines
Kami-Wakuya Station is served by the Ishinomaki Line, and is located 3.6 rail kilometers from the terminus of the line at Kogota Station.

Station layout
The station has one side platform serving a single bi-directional track. The station is unattended.

History
Kami-Wakuya Station opened on August 1, 1957. The station was absorbed into the JR East network upon the privatization of JNR on April 1, 1987.

Surrounding area

See also
 List of railway stations in Japan

External links

 

Railway stations in Miyagi Prefecture
Ishinomaki Line
Railway stations in Japan opened in 1957
Wakuya, Miyagi
Stations of East Japan Railway Company